Trond Berg (born 1934) is a Norwegian cell physiologist.

He hails from Svensby in Ullsfjord. After attending Troms Landsgymnas and the University of Oslo, he took his PHD at Rutgers University in 1968. He became a professor at the University of Tromsø and the University of Oslo; professor emeritus from 2004. He is a member of the Norwegian Academy of Science and Letters and won the Fridtjof Nansen Prize for Outstanding Research in 2008.

References

1934 births
Living people
People from Lyngen
Norwegian physiologists
University of Oslo alumni
Rutgers University alumni
Academic staff of the University of Tromsø
Academic staff of the University of Oslo
Members of the Norwegian Academy of Science and Letters